These are the list of Bhojpuri language films that released in 2022.

January–March

April–June

July–September

October–December

References

2022
Bhojpuri, 2022
Lists of 2022 films by country or language
2022 in Indian cinema